Sherman Alexander Hemsley (February 1, 1938 – July 24, 2012) was an American actor. He was known for his roles as George Jefferson on the CBS television series All in the Family (1973–1975; 1978) and The Jeffersons (1975–1985), Deacon Ernest Frye on the NBC series Amen (1986–1991), and B. P. Richfield on the ABC series Dinosaurs. Hemsley also played Judge Carl Robertson on the NBC series The Fresh Prince of Bel-Air. For his work on The Jeffersons, Hemsley was nominated for a Golden Globe Award and an Emmy Award. Hemsley also won an NAACP Image Award for Best Performance by an Actor in a Comedy Series or Special ("The Jeffersons") in 1982.

Biography

Early life, education and service
Hemsley was born and raised in South Philadelphia by his mother, who worked in a lamp factory. Hemsley did not meet his father until he was 14. Hemsley graduated from Barrat Middle School. For high school, Hemsley attended Central High School for ninth grade and Bok Technical High School for tenth. Hemsley dropped out of school after the tenth grade and joined the United States Air Force, where he served for four years.

On leaving the Air Force, Hemsley returned to Philadelphia, where he worked for the United States Postal Service during the day while attending the Academy of Dramatic Arts at night. He then moved to New York, continuing to work for the post office during the day while working as an actor at night. He starred as Gitlow in the early 1970s Broadway musical Purlie.

Career

Stage
 Hemsley performed with local groups in Philadelphia before moving to New York to study with Lloyd Richards at the Negro Ensemble Company. Shortly after, he joined Vinnette Carroll's Urban Arts Company appearing in these productions: But Never Jam Today, The Lottery, Old Judge Mose is Dead, Moon on a Rainbow Shawl, Step Lively Boys, Croesus, and The Witch. Hemsley made his Broadway debut in Purlie and toured with the show for a year. In the summer of 1972, Hemsley joined the Vinnette Carroll musical Don't Bother Me, I Can't Cope ensemble in Toronto, followed a month later in the American Conservatory Theater production at the Geary Theater. In this production, Hemsley performed the solos "Lookin' Over From Your Side" in Act I and "Sermon" in Act II.

Work with Norman Lear
 While Hemsley was on Broadway with Purlie, Norman Lear called him in 1971 to play the recurring role of George Jefferson in his new sitcom, All in the Family. Hemsley was reluctant to leave his theatre role, at which Lear told him he would hold the role open for him (another actor, Mel Stewart, played his brother for two episodes during this time). Hemsley joined the cast two years later. The characters of Hemsley and co-star Isabel Sanford were occasional supporting roles in All in the Family, then were given their own spin-off, The Jeffersons, in 1975. The Jeffersons proved to be one of Lear's most successful series, enjoying a run of eleven seasons through 1985.

1980s, 1990s, and 2000s
Hemsley continued to work steadily after the show's cancellation, largely typecast in George Jefferson-like roles. He teamed with the sitcom's original cast members when The Jeffersons moved to Broadway for a brief run. Hemsley later joined the cast of NBC's Amen in 1986 as Deacon Ernest Frye, a church deacon. The sitcom enjoyed a run of five seasons, ending in 1991. Hemsley then was a voice actor in the ABC live-action puppet series Dinosaurs, where he played Bradley P. Richfield, the boss of the main character, Earl. The series ran four seasons, ending in 1994.  In 1995, Hemsley made four appearances in the sitcom Sister, Sister as Tia and Tamera Mowry's grandfather.  In 1996, he had the lead role in the TV comedy series Goode Behavior, which lasted for one season.

Hemsley then cut back on his acting career, although Isabel Sanford and he occasionally appeared together in the mid to late 1990s and in the early 2000s, reprising their popular roles in guest appearances on such television series as The Fresh Prince of Bel-Air; in commercials for The Gap, Old Navy, and Denny's; and at dry cleaning conventions. He also starred with Sanford in a touring company of The Real Live Jeffersons stage show in the 1990s.  Sanford and he made a cameo appearance in the film Sprung (1997). They continued to work together on occasion until Sanford's health declined prior to her death in 2004. In 2001, Hemsley appeared as a contestant on the "Celebrity Classic TV Edition" special of ABC's hit primetime quiz show Who Wants to Be a Millionaire and won $125,000 for his charity. Hemsley also made a voice appearance as himself in the Seth MacFarlane animated comedy Family Guy in 2005. He appeared in the film American Pie Presents: The Book of Love (2009). In 2011, he reprised his role as George Jefferson for the final time, alongside Marla Gibbs as Florence Johnston, on Tyler Perry's House of Payne. Hemsley was inducted into the Television Academy Hall of Fame in 2012.

Music career
In 1989, Hemsley, who had been a jazz keyboardist, released a single, "Ain't That a Kick in the Head." This was followed in 1992 by Dance, an album of rhythm and blues music. He appeared on Soul Train around the time of the record's release and also performed the song "Eyes in the Dark.” Hemsley was an enthusiastic fan of 1970s progressive rock bands, including Yes, Gentle Giant, Gong, and Nektar.

Personal life
Unlike the characters he played, Hemsley was a shy and intensely private man, described by some as reclusive. He avoided the Hollywood limelight and little of his personal life was public knowledge beyond the facts that he never married and he had no children. In 2003, however, Hemsley granted a rare video interview to the Archive of American Television. "[Playing George Jefferson] was hard for me, but he was the character. I had to do it."

Death
On July 24, 2012, Hemsley died at his home in El Paso, Texas, at age 74. The cause of death was given as superior vena cava syndrome, a complication associated with lung and bronchial carcinomas. He had a malignant mass on one of his lungs for which chemotherapy and radiation had been recommended, according to the El Paso County Texas Medical Examiner's report.

Aftermath

On August 28, 2012, an El Paso news anchor interviewed Flora Isela Enchinton, the sole beneficiary of Hemsley's will, who said that the two were friends and had been business partners for more than two decades. During this time she lived with Hemsley and his friend Kenny Johnston. Enchinton told the Associated Press that Hemsley never mentioned any relatives. "Some people come out of the woodwork - they think Sherman, they think money", Enchinton told AP. "But the fact is that I did not know Sherman when he was in the limelight. I met them when they [Hemsley and Johnston] came running from Los Angeles with not one penny, when there was nothing but struggle."

A Philadelphia man named Richard Thornton claimed to be Hemsley's brother and the true heir to his estate. After contesting the will, Thornton halted progress on funeral arrangements, and as a result, Hemsley's body remained at the San Jose Funeral Home in El Paso and unburied for months. On November 9, 2012, the legal battle over Hemsley's body ended when Judge Patricia Chew ruled in favor of Enchinton. A military funeral was planned for Hemsley. He was interred at Fort Bliss National Cemetery in his adopted hometown of El Paso.

Filmography

Film
 Love at First Bite (1979) - Reverend Mike (film debut)
 Stewardess School (1986) - Mr. Buttersworth
 Ghost Fever (1986) - Buford/Jethro
 Club Fed (1990) - Reverend James Dooley
 Mr. Nanny (1993) - Burt Wilson
 Home of Angels (1994) - Buzzard Bracken
 The Misery Brothers (1995) - Rev. Scheister
 A Christmas Journey Home (1996) - Steve
 Sprung (1997) - Earl
 Casper: A Spirited Beginning (1997) - Harvey
 Senseless (1998) - James
 Mafia! (1998) - George Jefferson (uncredited)
 Screwed (2000) - Chip Oswald
 Hanging in Hedo (2008) - Henry Hunter
 For The Love Of A Dog (2008) - George O'Donnell
 American Pie Presents: The Book of Love (2009) - Pastor Reggie Johnston (final film role)

Television

 All in the Family (1973–1975; 1978) - George Jefferson
 The Jeffersons (1975–1985) - George Jefferson
 The Love Boat (1977-1983) - Henry Bullard / Maurice Marshall
 The Donny & Marie Show (1978?) - Guest star
 The Incredible Hulk (1979, season 2 episode 18 "No Escape") - Robert
 Pink Lady (1980; guest-starred) - Himself
 Purlie (1981, TV Movie) - Gitlow Judson
 Fantasy Island (November 7, 1981) (Season 5, Episode 5, "Mr. Nobody/La Liberatora") - Charlie Atkins
 E/R (1984) (guest spots as Nurse Julie Williams') - Uncle George Jefferson
 The Twilight Zone (1985, Episode: "I of Newton") - Sam
 Alice in Wonderland (1985, TV Movie) - Mouse
 Candid Camera (1986) - Dick Sherman
 Amen (1986–1991) - Deacon Ernest Frye
 227 (1988, guest starred in the episode "The Big Deal") - Thurmond Fox
 Camp Cucamonga (1990, TV Movie) - Herbert Himmel
 Dinosaurs (1991–1994) - B.P. Richfield (voice)
 The Fresh Prince of Bel-Air (1992-1996, guest starred, TV Series) - Judge Carl Robertson / George Jefferson
 Designing Women (1993, in the episode "Wedding Redux") - Mr. Ray Toussant
 In Living Color (February 14, 1993) - guest appearance as George Jefferson in sketch, Lashawn: Dry Cleaners
 Burke's Law (1994, in "Who Killed the Legal Eagle?") - Judge J.R. Powell
 Lois & Clark: The New Adventures of Superman (1994, in the Episode "Seasons Greedings") - Winslow P Schott, a.k.a. Toyman
 The Magic School Bus (1995, guest starred, in "Revved Up") - Mr. Junkit
 The Wayans Bros. (1995, episode "It's Shawn! It's Marlon! It's The Superboys!") - Mr. Stone
 Sister, Sister (1995, guest spots) - Grandpa Campbell
 Goode Behavior (1996–1997) - Willie Goode
 Martin (1996) - Mr. Washington
 All That (1997; guest starred in two episodes) - Doctor
 The Secret Diary of Desmond Pfeiffer (1998, guest starred in "Up, Up and Away") - Union Spy
 The Hughleys (1999–2000) - James Williams
 Family Matters (Captain Marion Savage — Carl's superior)
 All That (1997, Good Burger food critic / Mr. Gurman)
 Figure It Out (1999) (Guest Panelist)
 Up, Up, and Away (2000, TV Movie) - Edward Marshall / Steel Condor
 Mister Ed (2004, TV Movie) - Mr. Ed (voice)
 Family Guy (2005, in a voice cameo ("The Father, the Son, and the Holy Fonz") - Himself
 The Surreal Life (2006, cast member in 2006)
 Clunkers (2011, 8 episodes) - Boss
 Tyler Perry's House of Payne (2011, guest starred) - George Jefferson
 One Love (2014) - Grandpa Roy (final television role, filmed 2012)

Discography
 Dance (1992)

See also

References

External links

 
 
 
 
 
 

1938 births
2012 deaths
20th-century African-American male singers
21st-century African-American people
African-American male actors
American male film actors
American male musical theatre actors
American male television actors
Male actors from Philadelphia
United States Air Force airmen